Chelsea Province was an electorate of the Victorian Legislative Council. It existed as a two-member electorate from 1976 to 2006, with members holding alternating eight-year terms. It was a marginal seat throughout its existence, and was won by the party that won government at each election from 1982 to 2006. It was abolished from the 2006 state election in the wake of the Bracks Labor government's reform of the Legislative Council.

It was located in the south-east of Melbourne. In 2002, when it was last contested, it covered an area of 266 km2 and included the suburbs of Carrum, Carrum Downs, Chelsea, Cranbourne, Frankston, Hampton Park, Keysborough, Seaford and Springvale.

Members for Chelsea Province

Election results

Former electoral provinces of Victoria (Australia)
1976 establishments in Australia
2006 disestablishments in Australia